Kidnapped by Neptune is the third studio album by singer-songwriter Scout Niblett, released on Too Pure records. The album was Niblett's second collaboration with producer Steve Albini.

Track listing

Personnel
Scout Niblett - vocals, guitar, bass, drums, piano
Jason Kourkounis - drums, handclapping
Greg Norman - handclapping
Jonathan Reig - handclapping
Chris Saligoe - guitar

Technical personnel 
Steve Albini - engineer
Paul Schiek - photography (cover art)

References

2005 albums
Scout Niblett albums
Albums produced by Steve Albini